Lego Rock Raiders was a Lego theme focused on mining equipment that released in 1999 and 2000. It was the only underground-based Lego theme before Lego Power Miners. The theme, while short-lived, featured sixteen construction sets and numerous story-related media, including three books and a video game.

Overview 
Lego Rock Raiders was a short-lived Lego theme that lasted for two years. It was launched in 1999 and discontinued in 2000. Despite this short lifespan, the theme introduced an elaborate storyline that was delivered through video games and comics. The storyline centered on the crew of the spaceship the LMS Explorer and their search for energy crystals. The toy sets were all set on an alien planet. The storyline involved the Rock Raiders' spaceship being sucked through a wormhole into a distant galaxy. The crew must then mine for energy crystals but in the process must also face territorial Rock Monsters. In 2009, the Power Miners theme was launched, which despite not being set in an alien galaxy, had similarities to the Rock Raiders theme by focusing on a group of miners.

Characters

There are six characters in the Lego Rock Raiders theme.
 Axle – The Rock Raiders' best driver, he has been seen to be somewhat impulsive and tends to dive headfirst into a dangerous situation, though he is very capable of defending himself. Axle is happiest when he is driving the Chrome Crusher, the Rock Raiders' largest land vehicle. His ability to handle anything with wheels is second to none; he has won the Lego World Racing Champion award three times, making him one of the fastest in the galaxy.
 Bandit – The Rock Raiders' greatest sailor, he is happiest when cruising the underground lakes and rapids on the Rapid Rider. He is also the Rock Raiders' head navigator, he always knows his exact location. After spending so much time underwater and on the Rapid Rider, he tends to be a little shaky on land.
 Chief – The oldest, wisest and most experienced Rock Raider. He is calm in any situation and has the experience to solve almost any problem. Chief captains the LMS Explorer, from which he commands his team, and is always ready to teleport them out if something goes wrong in a cavern. Years ago he lost his left arm while rescuing miners from a cave-in on Pluto; it was replaced with a mechanical arm, capable of shooting plasma blasts. Chief has never left the LMS Explorer in twenty years, he loves it so much that he has made it his home. He is rumored to have encountered a rock monster in his youth.
 Docs – The Rock Raiders' head Geologist and Commander. Docs is a very calm person, and fully assesses a situation, covering every possible plan, though sometimes he spends too much time thinking.
 Jet – The most courageous and strong-willed of all the Rock Raiders, she is a very skilled pilot and is always ready to take on new, exciting challenges. She is ready for any challenge she always approaches her missions with a level head.
 Sparks – An expert on all things mechanical and electrical, though unfortunately he is also very clumsy. He is always taking things apart, but sometimes he forgets to put them back together. He is credited with designing most of the Rock Raiders’ equipment.

Energy crystals

Energy crystals are yellowish-green crystals that contain vast amounts of energy, and are the main sources of power for the Rock Raiders. However, they also serve as the primary food source for the monsters and slugs on Planet U, often resulting in conflicts between them and the Rock Raiders. Energy crystals were introduced in Lego Rock Raiders, and have appeared in several themes since then.

When an energy crystal's energy has been depleted, either by use of a Mining Laser or by Slimy Slugs, it turns either a dark gray or a purple color and has to be recharged at a Recharge Seam.

A rare variety of red energy crystals, five times more powerful than normal green ones, appears in the PlayStation video game, where they serve as bonus pickups to challenge the player for a better score.

Planet U

Planet U is the alien planet featured in Rock Raiders. The entire plot takes place on this planet. Planet U is located in another galaxy, outside of the Milky Way. The rock below the planet's surface is abundant with Lego ore and energy crystals. Monsters made out of rock, ice, and lava live in caverns deep underground, feeding on the energy crystals. Other creatures like giant slugs, scorpions, and spiders also make their homes in the tunnels. Runs found in one of the books suggests an intelligent civilization may have once lived on the planet. Planet U has very little oxygen, the Rock Raiders must build Support Stations to purify the air, and make it breathable.

Vehicles

 Cargo Carrier - A large catamaran used to ferry equipment across underground lakes and rivers. It has a large cargo hold that is able to carry small vehicles and Rock Raiders across water. It only appeared in the Windows version of the video game.
 Chrome Crusher - A massive vehicle has everything a Rock Raider may need in the dangerous caverns. It's equipped with a powerful drill and a high-energy mining laser to plow through any kind of rock, as well as a large scanner dish and a giant cargo hold (though the latter two aren't functional in the video game).
 Floating Platform - An unmanned platform that floats across bodies of water or lava, used when no other vehicles that can cross those are available. It only appears in the North American PlayStation version of the video game.
 Granite Grinder - A two-legged walker with a giant drill for quickly grinding through rock, as well as boosters to help it jump over crevices and obstacles (though it can't do this in the video game). Its unique "walker" legs allow it to cross rubble and rock debris safely and easily. A different vehicle also called a Granite Grinder later appeared in Lego Power Miners.
 Hover Scout - A small, floating vehicle designed to make long-distance reconnaissance over land easy and quick. It uses hover propulsion technology to travel at high speeds over rubble and debris that would slow down a Rock Raider on foot.
 Hoverboard - A vehicle similar to the Hover Scout, but able to carry a passenger. It does not appear in either version of the video game, and is only named in An Interactive Puzzle Storybook.
 Large Mobile Laser Cutter - A large six-wheeled vehicle with a high-energy laser used for blasting through rock. It did not come in any sets, and only appears in the video game.
 LMS Explorer - A massive space ship that houses all of the Rock Raiders and their equipment. It has an energy shield, protecting it from space debris, powerful scanning equipment, a teleportation system between the ship and the planet, and engines capable of reaching light-speed. The Rock Raiders must repair the ship using resourced from Planet U in order to return home.
Loader Dozer - A heavy-duty bulldozer good for clearing large areas of rubble quickly. It can also be used to carry raw materials, and can break through masses of spider web.
 Rapid Rider - Also known as the CAT, this vehicle is a small catamaran used to travel across underground lakes and rivers. It can carry a small amount of cargo, making it more useful as a reconnaissance craft.
 Small Digger - A small four-wheeled vehicle that uses two chainsaws to cut through rock quicker than a Rock Raider could, though slower than any other drilling vehicles.
 Small Mobile Laser Cutter - A small six-wheeled vehicle with a high-energy laser used for blasting through rock. It did not come in any sets, and only appears in the video game.
 Small Transport Truck - A small truck designed to quickly transport raw materials from an excavation site to Rock Raider HQ much more efficiently than a Rock Raider could.
 Tunnel Scout - A small helicopter ideal for more advanced reconnaissance, as it can fly over water, lava and land. It gives the Rock Raider team greater flexibility over mixed terrain and its high speed keeps the pilot out of trouble.
 Tunnel Transport - A giant helicopter with tandem rotors (though to its sides rather than at the front and back) that can haul cargo and vehicles through tunnels very quickly. In the PlayStation version of the video game, it can even carry the Chrome Crusher, as well as being able to lift stranded Rock Raiders safely aboard. The Hoverboard can be stored in the back compartment.

Buildings
Rock Raider HQ is made up of a number of buildings. Buildings must be constructed by power paths, which can be used to link buildings together to allow power to flow to them all. Rock Raiders can run much faster on power paths than rubble or cavern floor, and power paths can also be used as dams to temporarily block lava erosion.

 Docks - A building that can only be constructed on the banks of bodies of water. It's used for teleporting and mooring the Rapid Rider and Cargo Carrier, as well as training Rock Raiders as sailors.
 Geological Center - The Geological Scanner is where geologists bring rock samples for study. Its large GeoScanner scans the entire cavern. The Geological Center is where Rock Raider cadets can train as geologists.
 Mining Laser - A stationary version of the Large Mobile Laser Cutter, with a high-energy laser beam that can be used to blast through most types of rock, at the price of energy crystals.
 Ore Refinery - A processing plant that refines raw Lego ore into Building Studs.
 Power Station - The Power Station is extremely important, as it is where the power is extracted from the energy crystals and used to power the buildings at Rock Raider HQ. Once a Power Station has been constructed, the energy crystals collected are taken here and used to power the base.
 Super Teleport - The Super Teleport, also called the Large Teleport Pad, has more than double the power of the Teleport Pad. Once constructed you can teleport down the largest land vehicles from the LMS Explorer. In the PlayStation game, its landing pad can sometimes be found by itself, as a place for the Tunnel Transport to land.
 Support Station - The Support Station is extremely important, it replenishes the air supply in caverns which have limited levels of oxygen in them. It also acts as a lunchroom for the Rock Raiders. The Support Station is where Rock Raider cadets can train as drivers.
 Teleport Pad - The Teleport Pad is a very important building. Rock Raiders and the Small Vehicles use the Teleport Pad to travel into the caverns from the LMS Explorer. The Teleport Pad is also where Rock Raider cadets can train as pilots.
 Tool Store - The Tool Store is the first building needed for any Rock Raider HQ and is the starting point of every base. It is a multi-purpose building, as it not only acts as a temporary Teleport Pad, but also stores all the tools needed by the Rock Raider team. Collected raw materials are also stored in the Tool Store.
 Upgrade Station - The Upgrade Station is where Rock Raiders bring vehicles to be repaired or upgraded. The Upgrade Station is where Rock Raider cadets can train as engineers.

Creatures
Monsters - Very little is known about the monsters, mainly because very few have ever been seen. They are obviously the dominant species of Planet U. Their main source of food happens to be the energy crystals, so they keep a close eye on them. Monsters have been known to hide many energy crystals in a single cavern, and conceal the entrance. There are three variations of monsters: rock, ice, and lava. Only rock monsters appear in any sets.
 Rock whales - The largest creatures on all of Planet U. Their bodies are large, long and made completely of stone. They have six legs, and two large, pitch black eyes. Like scorpions and spiders, there are two types of them: the metallic maroon type, which are capable of running incredibly fast and destroying any vehicles that get in their way, and the light brown type, which are slow and docile. In the PlayStation video game, the latter of the two types can be manipulated by Pusher Beams to jump into water, forming a land bridge for Rock Raiders to cross.
 Scorpions - There are two types of giant scorpions on Planet U: purple scorpions that  attack using their claws, and green ones that are capable of firing bursts of energy from their claws.
 Slimy slugs - Slimy slugs are large, green slugs with a layer of slime to help them slither faster. Like the monsters, their main food source is the energy crystals. However, unlike the monsters they do not swallow the energy crystals, instead they suck the energy out of them. Slimy slugs are short enough to crawl under electric fences, and due to their thick hides they can withstand laser fire, though they are usually docile.
 Spiders - There are two types of spiders on Planet U: a smaller, harmless type that causes Rock Raiders to slip, and a larger, venomous type that can spin webs that can trap any vehicles; the only thing that can clear the webs is the scoop of the Loader Dozer.
 Bats - Bats seem to thrive in the deep caverns of Planet U. They live in large groups and are harmless, though they do not like to be disturbed by the noise of drilling. They are rarely seen around Rock Raider HQ. In the Windows version of Lego Rock Raiders, black bats cause some rock raiders to run in fear, disrupting mining operations.

Construction sets
The Lego Rock Raiders theme featured fifteen Lego sets in total. Eight main sets were released in 1999, while seven smaller ones were released in 2000. First editions of the 1999 sets included promotional mini comic books. Four of the sets released in 2000 were promotional sets sold by Kabaya Foods Corporation.

Books and comics
Three books and a number of comics about the Lego Rock Raiders theme were published.
 Rock Raiders: An Interactive Puzzle Storybook – An illustrated storybook published in 1999 by Dorling Kindersley, every scene in the book is accompanied by a puzzle relating to something a character said or saw, with solutions to the puzzles in the back of the book. Written by Anna Knight, illustrated by Roger Harris.
 Rock Raiders: High Adventure Deep Underground – A graphic novel published in 2000 by Lego Systems Inc. The novel told, in Jet's point-of-view and in greater detail, the events on Planet U. There are a few puzzles on certain pages. Written by Alan Grant, illustrated by Robin Smith and Lego Media.
 Race for Survival – A short novel published by Dorling Kindersley in 2000, aimed at kids in Grades 2–4. At the side of each page is a small article on Geology. The story takes place six months after the events in the other books and the video games. Written by Marie Birkinshaw, illustrated by Roger Harris.

There were also small promotional mini comic books included with specially marked, first edition releases of the main eight Lego Rock Raiders sets from 1999.

Video game

A real-time strategy video game of the same name as the theme was developed by Data Design Interactive and released for Microsoft Windows in 1999,  with an action-adventure PlayStation game following under a year later.

Original plans

The Ultimate Lego Book contained concept art for Lego Rock Raiders on pages 30–31, showing how the theme developed over time. The original plans were vastly different:

Different outfit designs for the Rock Raiders, with goggles and scarfs.
Mysterious aliens traveling with the Rock Raiders.
Rock monsters were larger, and some had tails and acted more like animals.
The Chrome Crusher appears with two drills (similar to its upgraded form in the video game) and no laser.
The Loader-Dozer has a drill and a gun.
A scrapped flying rocket-like vehicle which somewhat resembles the Tunnel Scout.
A scrapped vehicle with robotic arms, a drill and laser turrets.
A mobile Rock Raiders HQ, with crystal and ore Refineries and giant arms.
A Hover Scout with cargo capacity.

See also 
 Lego Power Miners

References

External links
 Lugnet – Rock Raiders
 Lego.com – Rock Raiders PC
 Lego.com – Rock Raiders PS1
 Rock Raiders theme on Peeron.com
 Brickset Database of Rock Raiders

Rock Raiders
Comics based on toys
Products introduced in 1999
Products and services discontinued in 2000